Robert 'Bob' Hall (born 13 June 1942 in West Byfleet, Surrey, England), is an English boogie-woogie pianist. A long-time collaborator of Alexis Korner, he also performed regularly with bottleneck bluesman Dave Kelly and his sister, Jo Ann Kelly.

Career
Founder member of several British blues bands including The Groundhogs, Tramp, The Sunflower Blues Band and The De Luxe Blues Band, Hall has worked and recorded with artists such as Peter Green, Danny Kirwan and Mick Fleetwood, of Fleetwood Mac, and is also a long serving member of Savoy Brown, and guests with The Blues Band, featuring Paul Jones, Dave Kelly and Tom McGuinness.

Hall was also a founder-member, with Ian Stewart, of the Boogie Woogie Big Band which later became Rocket 88, and which included Hal Singer, Don Weller and Dick Morrissey among many leading jazzmen, together with Charlie Watts, Alexis Korner, and Jack Bruce.

As a sideman, he has accompanied such blues names as John Lee Hooker, Howlin’ Wolf, Little Walter,<ref>[https://books.google.com/books?id=iAT94AFnA1gC&q=%22Bob+Hall%22+AND+Routledge with a feeling: the Little Walter story by Tony Glover, Scott Dirks, Ward Gaines. Routledge, 2002]  at Google Books</ref> Jimmy Witherspoon, Chuck Berry, Homesick James, Lightnin' Slim, Lowell Fulsom, Charlie Musselwhite, Snooky Pryor, J. B. Hutto, Lazy Lester, Dave Peabody, Baby Boy Warren, Eddie "Guitar" Burns, Eddie Taylor, Big John Wrencher, Mickey Baker, and Eddy Clearwater.

An acknowledged authority on blues and boogie woogie piano, Hall has contributed to a number of magazines and books and is the sleeve-note writer for the Yazoo Records piano blues series. He has worked on the piano sections of The Routledge Encyclopaedia of the Blues''.

References

1942 births
Living people
Boogie-woogie pianists
British blues pianists
English pianists
English blues musicians
People from West Byfleet
The Groundhogs members
Savoy Brown members
21st-century pianists
Tramp (band) members